Sceloporus spinosus, the eastern spiny lizard, is a species of lizard in the family Phrynosomatidae. It is endemic to Mexico.

References

spinosus
Endemic reptiles of Mexico
Reptiles described in 1828
Taxa named by Arend Friedrich August Wiegmann